Adam Brown Block is a historic commercial building located at Rochester in Monroe County, New York, United States. It is a four-story brick building with terra cotta trim built in 1885 in the Romanesque Revival style.

It was listed on the National Register of Historic Places in 1985.

See also
 National Register of Historic Places listings in Rochester, New York

References

Commercial buildings in Rochester, New York
Commercial buildings on the National Register of Historic Places in New York (state)
Commercial buildings completed in 1885
National Register of Historic Places in Rochester, New York